Paralyzed is the second studio album by American doom metal band Witch, founded by J Mascis of Dinosaur Jr.

Track listing 
 "Eye" - 3:41
 "Gone" - 4:40
 "1000 MPH" - 3:21
 "Spacegod" - 4:38
 "Disappear" - 3:37
 "Sweet Sue" - 4:53
 "Psychotic Rock" - 4:44
 "Mutated" - 2:12
 "Old Trap Line" - 5:54

References

2008 albums
Witch (band) albums
Tee Pee Records albums